Helen Lumbreras (Cuenca, 1935 - Barcelona, 1995) was a Spanish filmmaker and screenwriter. She co-founded Colectivo Cine de Clase.

Filmography 
 España (1964)
 España 68 (1968)
 El cuarto poder (1970)
 El campo para el hombre (1975)
 O todos o ninguno (1976)
 A la vuelta del grito (1977)

See also 
 Cinema of Spain

References

External links 
 

1935 births
1995 deaths
Spanish women screenwriters
Spanish women film directors
20th-century Spanish screenwriters